Leanne Manas (born 14 October 1978) is a South African businesswoman and TV presenter at the SABC especially known as the anchor of the flagship show, Morning Live.

Education
Manas has a BA (Hons) in English and Communications and a diploma in Speech and Drama teaching from Trinity College London. Her interest in finance journalism led her to completing a Postgraduate Diploma in Economics Journalism from Rhodes University.

Career
Manas's broadcasting career started in 2001, with the anchoring role at the Essential Business Channel Summit TV. This lasted until 2003. While working in Essential Business Channel Summit TV, she started hosting the SABC 3 programmes, Business Update and Business Focus. In 2004 Manas became the presenter on South Africa’s longest-running breakfast programme, SABC 2’s Morning Live.

Manas has worked for radio stations such as Radio Algoa, Jacaranda FM, SAfm and East Coast Radio.

She was appointed a Goodwill Ambassador by UNHCR, the United Nations Refugee Agency in January 2019.

References

External links
Leanne Manas on Twitter
Leanne Manas on Facebook

1978 births
South African television journalists
South African women journalists
South African television presenters
Rhodes University alumni
Living people